Tuscaloosa station is an Amtrak intercity rail station located at 2105 Greensboro Avenue one mile south of downtown Tuscaloosa, Alabama. Currently served exclusively by the Crescent to New York or New Orleans, the station was originally operated by the  Southern Railway. Tuscaloosa was one of the last railroad-operated active passenger stations in the country, as the Southern Crescent, predecessor to the current Amtrak train, was still operated by the Southern well into the Amtrak era.

References

External links 

Tuscaloosa Amtrak Station (USA Rail Guide -- Train Web)

Transportation in Tuscaloosa, Alabama
Amtrak stations in Alabama
Stations along Southern Railway lines in the United States
Railway stations in the United States opened in 1911
Transportation buildings and structures in Tuscaloosa County, Alabama